Antonella Zanna Munthe-Kaas is an Italian applied mathematician and numerical analyst whose research includes work on numerical integration of differential equations and applications to medical imaging. She is a professor and head of the mathematics department at the University of Bergen in Norway.

Education
Zanna was born in Molfetta, in southern Italy, and earned a degree in mathematics from the University of Bari.
She completed her PhD in the Department of Applied Mathematics and Theoretical Physics at the University of Cambridge in 1998. Her dissertation, Numerical Solution of Isospectral Flows, was supervised by Arieh Iserles.

Recognition
Zanna won the Second Prize in the Leslie Fox Prize for Numerical Analysis in 1997.
She is a member of the Norwegian Academy of Technological Sciences.

Personal life
Zanna married to Norwegian mathematician Hans Munthe-Kaas in 1997; they have two children and a dog.

References

Further reading
 (newspaper story about late Christmas shopping with Zanna and her sister)

External links

Year of birth missing (living people)
Living people
People from Molfetta
Italian mathematicians
Italian women mathematicians
Norwegian mathematicians
Norwegian women mathematicians
Numerical analysts
University of Bari alumni
Alumni of the University of Cambridge
Academic staff of the University of Bergen
Members of the Norwegian Academy of Technological Sciences